The Winsor Dam and the Goodnough Dike impound the waters of the Swift River and the Ware River Diversion forming the Quabbin Reservoir, the largest water body in Massachusetts. According to the Massachusetts Department of Conservation and Recreation the Winsor Dam is one of the largest dams in the Eastern U.S. The Winsor Dam is part of the Chicopee River Watershed. The Winsor Dam was named for Frank E. Winsor, its chief engineer.

Characteristics

The dam has the following characteristics:
 Length: 2640 ft (805 m)
 Top width: 35 ft (10.7 m)
 Max. bottom width: 1100 ft (335 m)
 Height above river: 170 ft (52 m)
 Height above bedrock: 295 ft (90 m)
 Amount of earth fill: 4 million cubic yards (3,000,000 m3).

References

External links
Technical information
Information about the Quabbin Reservoir
Court order and statement of facts about MWRA facilities

Dams in Massachusetts
Buildings and structures in Hampshire County, Massachusetts
Hydraulic engineering
Dams completed in 1939